Public Be Damned is a 1917 American silent drama film directed by Stanner E.V. Taylor and starring Mary Fuller, Charles Richman and Chester Barnett. The film's negative portrayal of food hoarding at a time of increased shortages due to the American entry into World War I led to it being publicly endorsed by Herbert Hoover, who shot a prologue to introduce the film. It was followed shortly afterwards by a similarly-themed production The Food Gamblers by Allan Dwan.

Cast
 Mary Fuller as Marion Fernley 
 Charles Richman as John Black 
 Chester Barnett as Robert Merritt 
 Joseph W. Smiley as Bill Garvin 
 Russell Bassett as David Higgins 
 Herbert Hoover as himself

References

Bibliography
 Frederic Lombardi. Allan Dwan and the Rise and Decline of the Hollywood Studios. McFarland, 2013.

External links

1917 films
1917 drama films
Silent American drama films
Films directed by Stanner E.V. Taylor
American silent feature films
1910s English-language films
American black-and-white films
Selznick Pictures films
1910s American films
English-language drama films